Richie Driss is an English television presenter, best known for presenting the weekly CBBC programme Blue Peter and becoming the 38th presenter on the show.

Early life and career
Driss was born in St Albans, Hertfordshire. He attended both Roundwood Park and Sir John Lawes School in Harpenden. He joined Blue Peter as its 38th presenter in May 2019, replacing Radzi Chinyanganya.

On 3 February 2023, Driss announced that he would leave the show, with his last show to be aired on 3 March.

Driss is also a Manchester United F.C. fan.

References

External links

Year of birth missing (living people)
Living people
Blue Peter presenters
British television personalities
People from St Albans
English people of Algerian descent